Sakuragawa Station (桜川駅) is the name of two train stations in Japan:

Sakuragawa Station (Osaka)
 Sakuragawa Station (Shiga)